Anna Fowler (born 28 January 1991) is an English curler.

At the national level, she is a four-time English women's champion (2011, 2013, 2020, 2023), 2014 English mixed champion, and five-time English mixed doubles champion (2016, 2017, 2018, 2019, 2020) curler.

Her brother Ben Fowler is also a curler, Anna's mixed and mixed doubles teammate.

Teams

Women's curling

Mixed curling

Mixed doubles

References

External links 

 Video: 

Living people
1991 births
English female curlers
English curling champions
Place of birth missing (living people)